Local Consequences of the Global Cold War is a 2007 non-fiction book about the effects produced by the Cold War. It was published by the Stanford University Press.

References

2007 non-fiction books
English-language books
Books about the Cold War
Stanford University Press books
American non-fiction books